Fireman, Save My Child is a 1927 film featuring the part-time screen comedy team of Wallace Beery and Raymond Hatton.  The film was written by Monte Brice and Thomas J. Geraghty, and directed by A. Edward Sutherland. A print of this film is known to exist.

Cast
Wallace Beery as Elmer
Raymond Hatton as Sam
Josephine Dunn as Dora Dumston
Tom Kennedy as Captain Kennedy
Roland Drew as Walter Goss
Joseph W. Girard as Chief Dumston
Thelma Todd (uncredited role)

References

External links

1927 comedy films
American black-and-white films
Silent American comedy films
American silent feature films
Films directed by A. Edward Sutherland
Films about firefighting
Paramount Pictures films
1920s American films
1920s English-language films